David Bourne (born April 8, 1970), known professionally as JR Bourne, is a Canadian actor. He portrayed Chris Argent on all six seasons of the MTV supernatural drama series Teen Wolf (2011–2017) and was part of the main cast in the final season. Bourne has also appeared as a series regular on the ABC mystery drama Somewhere Between (2017) and The CW science fiction drama The 100 (2019–2020). Other notable television roles include Martouf / Lantash on the Showtime science fiction adventure Stargate SG-1 (1998–2000), CIA Agent Edwards on the Fox science fiction drama Fringe (2009–2011), and Kenny Ryan on the ABC drama Revenge (2012–2013).

Outside of television, Bourne has won two Vancouver Film Critics Circle Awards for Best Supporting Actor in a Canadian Film for On the Corner in 2004 and Everything's Gone Green in 2007. He also received nominations for Best Supporting Performance by a Male in a Feature Length Drama for both films at the Leo Awards.

Charity work
Bourne's niece Madison was born with the genetic disorder cystic fibrosis. The actor has long been a champion of the Cystic Fibrosis Foundation. In an interview with MTV News, Bourne revealed that he had come to realize back when he'd first started doing conventions for Teen Wolf how amazing of a platform it provided to raise money and awareness for the foundation.

Filmography

Film

Television

Accolades

Notes and references

External links
 

1970 births
Living people
Canadian male film actors
Canadian male television actors
Canadian male voice actors
Male actors from Toronto